Marcus & Martinus, occasionally known as M&M, are a Norwegian dance-pop duo consisting of identical twin brothers Marcus and Martinus Gunnarsen (born 21 February 2002 in Elverum, Norway). They have released three albums: Hei, Together and Moments. Since winning Melodi Grand Prix Junior in 2012, they have won numerous prizes, such as Spellemannprisen in 2017.

Career

2012: Melodi Grand Prix junior

In 2012 Marcus & Martinus were contestants on the eleventh season of Melodi Grand Prix Junior. It was held at the Oslo Spektrum in Oslo, Norway, and was broadcast live by Norwegian Broadcasting Corporation (NRK), hosted by Margrethe Røed and Tooji. They won the contest with the song "To dråper vann" (English: "Two Drops of Water"). The song peaked to number 8 on the Norwegian Singles Chart.

2015–2016: Hei & Together
On 23 February 2015, they released their debut studio album Hei (English: Hi). The album peaked at number 1 on the Norwegian Albums Chart in week 46 of 2015 (15 November 2015) after having charted for 35 weeks, the last 20 not leaving the top ten. The album includes the single "Plystre på deg" (English: "Whistle at You"). On 24 July 2015, they released the single "Elektrisk" (English: "Electric"), featuring vocals from Katastrofe. The song peaked at number 3 on the Norwegian Singles Chart. On 25 September 2015, they released the single "Ei som deg" (English: "One Like You") with Innertier. The song peaked at number 15 on the Norwegian Singles Chart. On 6 November they released the second version of their album Hei, "Hei (Fan Special)" with the same songs and some extras, one of the extras is Elektrisk. In May 2016, the duo released three singles. The first, "Girls", featuring Madcon, debuted at number 1 in Norway and became their second single to reach the top 100 in Sweden after "Elektrisk". The second and third, "Heartbeat" and "I Don't Wanna Fall in Love", followed just days after the release of "Girls" and debuted at numbers 21 and 37, respectively. They followed up "Girls" with the singles "Light It Up" and "One More Second". In November 2016, they released their first English album titled Together. The album includes their hit songs "Girls", "Heartbeat", "Light It Up" and "One More Second". In the week after its release, Together debuted at number 1 in Norway and Sweden and number 6 in Finland. As the Young Talent Act of the 2016 Nobel Peace Prize Concert, they performed "Without You" and "Bae" at Telenor Arena in Norway on 11 December 2016.

2017–2021
On 13 May. On 21 May 2017, they released the single "Like It Like It" alongside American rapper Silentó. On 1 July, they released the single "First Kiss". The same month, on 14 July, they performed on Swedish Crown Princess Victoria's 40th birthday with their own song written especially for her ("On This Day"). In late July, they released the single "Dance with You". On 15 October 2017, they released their single "Make You Believe in Love". The single reached 34th place in Norway and 47th place in Sweden. It also featured in CelebMix's 21 songs by Under-21s in 2018. On 4 November, they released their single "One Flight Away". On 15 November they released their single "Never" On 17 November, they released their third album Moments. On 27 September, they released their single "Invited".

In 2019 they released an EP called Soon. In 2020, they have released two singles, "Love You Less", and "It's Christmas Time". In 2021, they have been featured on the song "Miserabel" by Stig Brenner. Furthermore Marcus & Martinus released the single "Belinda" together with Latin star Alex Rose, which reached 20th place on the Norwegian singles chart. In November, they released the song "Feel" alongside Bruno Martini.

2022–present
In Spring 2022 they won the competition of Masked Singer Sverige, being the first duo sharing first place. In addition the duo released their first single in 2022 called "When All the Lights Go Out". 

In 2023, they entered Melodifestivalen 2023 with the song "Air". They finished in second place behind former Eurovision winner Loreen.

Discography

 Hei (2015)
 Together (2016)
 Moments (2017)

Filmography

Films

Television

Tour
Headlining
  (2016–2017)
  (2018)

Supporting
 Jason Derulo – 2Sides Tour (2018)

Awards and nominations

References

External links

Child pop musicians
Sibling musical duos
Norwegian child singers
Norwegian musical duos
Norwegian twins
Norwegian expatriates in Sweden
People from Elverum
2002 births
Living people
Melodi Grand Prix Junior contestants
Sony BMG artists
21st-century Norwegian singers
21st-century Norwegian male singers
Melodifestivalen contestants of 2023